This is a discography of the Italian DJ and producer Benny Benassi.

Albums

Studio albums
2003: Hypnotica
2008: Rock 'n' Rave
2011: Electroman
2016: Danceaholic

Compilation albums
2003: DJ Set 1
2004: Subliminal Sessions 6
2004: Re-Sfaction
2005: The Gallery: Live Sessions (with Tall Paul)
2005: Cooking for Pump-Kin: Phase One
2006: Re-Sfaction 2
2006: Best of Benny Benassi
2007: Cooking for Pump-Kin: Special Menu
2009: Toolroom Knights

Singles

As lead artist

As featured artist

Remixes

2003
 Alizée – "I'm Not Twenty" (Benny Banassi Remix)

2004
 The Mamas and The Papas – "California Dreaming 2004" (Benny Benassi Remix)
 Mylène Farmer – Pardonne-moi (Benny Benassi Sfaction Club Remix)

2006
 Faithless – "Bombs" (Benny Benassi Remix)

2007
 Sean Callery – "24 Theme" (Benny Benassi Lifesucks Remix)

2008
 Jordin Sparks and Chris Brown – "No Air" (Benny Benassi Pump-Kin Remix)
 Lisa Miskovsky – "Still Alive" (Benny Benassi Remix)

2009
 Flo Rida featuring Akon – "Available" (Benny Benassi Remix)
 Honorebel featuring Pitbull and Jump Smokers – "Now You See It (Shake That Ass)" (Benny Benassi Remix)

2010
 Kelis – "Acapella" (Benny Benassi Remix)
 will.i.am and Nicki Minaj – "Check It Out" (Benny Benassi Remix)
 Shakira – "Did It Again" (Benny Benassi Remix)
 Tiësto – "I Will Be Here" (Benny Benassi Dub Remix)
 Example – "Last Ones Standing" (Benny Benassi Remix)
 Alesha Dixon – Drummer Boy (Benny Benassi Remix)

2011
 Enrique Iglesias featuring Pitbull and The WAV.s – "I Like How It Feels" (Benny Benassi Radio Edit)
 Avril Lavigne – "What The Hell" (Benny Benassi Remix)
 Katy Perry – "E.T." (Benny Benassi Club Instrumental)
 Britney Spears – "Womanizer" (Benny Benassi Extended)
 LMFAO – "Party Rock Anthem" (Benny Benassi Radio Edit)
 Labrinth – "Earthquake" (Benny Benassi Remix)
 Laidback Luke vs. Example – "Natural Disaster" (Benny Benassi Remix)
 Florence + The Machine – "Shake It Out" (Benny Benassi Remix)

2012
 Adam Lambert – "Trespassing" (Benny Benassi Remix)
 Calvin Harris – "Feel So Close" (Benny Benassi Remix)
 Marina and the Diamonds – "Primadonna" (Benny Benassi Remix)
The Rolling Stones – "Doom & Gloom" (Benny Benassi Remix)

2013
 Mika – "Stardust" (Benny Benassi Mix)
 John Legend – "Made To Love" (Benny Benassi Remix)
 Dido – "No Freedom" (Benny Benassi Remix)
 Madonna – "Celebration" (Benny Benassi Remix)
 Alex Gaudino featuring Jordin Sparks – "Is This Love" (Benny Benassi Remix)

2014
 Chromeo – "Jealous" (Benny Benassi Remix) 
 Daddy's Groove featuring Teammate – "Pulse" (Benny Benassi Remix)
 Daft Punk  – "The Grid" (Benny Benassi Remix)

2015
 Leona Lewis – "Fire Under My Feet" (Benny Benassi Remix)
 Giorgio Moroder featuring Sia – "Déjà Vu" (Benny Benassi Club Remix) 
 Lincoln Jesser – "In My Place" (Benny Benassi Remix)

2016
 19eighty7 – "Get On It" (Benny Benassi and Mazzz Remix) 
 Tiga – "Make Me Fall In Love" (Benny Benassi Remix)

2017
 Francesco Gabbani – "Occidentali's Karma" (Benny Benassi and Mazzz Remix)
 Bruno Martini – "Living On The Outside" (Benny Benassi and Mazzz Remix)
 Christian Hudson – "Four Leaf Clover" (Benny Benassi Remix)
 Sofi Tukker – "Fuck They" (Benny Benassi and Mazzz Remix) 
 Crystal Fighters – "Yellow Sun" (Benny Benassi Remix) 
 The Script – "Arms Open" (Benny Benassi, Mazzz and Rivaz Remix)
 Jack Savoretti – "Whiskey Tango" (Benny Benassi and Mazzz Remix)

2018
 Fischerspooner – "TopBrazil" (Benny Benassi, Constantin and Mazzz Remix)
 Yxng Bane – "Vroom" (Benny Benassi Remix)
 Janet Jackson and Daddy Yankee – "Made for Now" (Benny Benassi and Canova Remix)

2019
 The Prince Karma – "Later Bitches" (Benny Benassi, Mazzz and Constantin Remix)
 Deorro – "Wild Like the Wind" (Benny Benassi and DJ Licious Remix)
 Patrick Martin – "Stranger Nights" (Benny Benassi Remix)
 Sigala and Becky Hill – "Wish You Well" (Benny Benassi Remix)
 Tiësto, Jonas Blue and Rita Ora – "Ritual" (Benny Benassi and B.B. Team Remix)
 Madonna featuring Swae Lee – "Crave" (Benny Benassi and B.B. Team Remix)
 Sean Paul – "When It Comes To You" (Benny Benassi and B.B. Team Remix)

2020
 Low Steppa featuring Reigns – "Wanna Show You" (Benny Benassi and B.B. Team Remix)

2021
 Becky Hill and David Guetta – "Remember" (Benny Benassi Remix)
 David Solomon featuring Ryan Tedder – "Learn To Love Me" (Benny Benassi Remix)

2022
 Telykast and Sam Grey - "Unbreakable" (Benny Benassi Remix)
 Twice – "The Feels" (Benny Benassi Remix)

With Benassi Bros.

 Pumphonia (2004)
 ...Phobia (2005)

References

External links
 

Discographies of Italian artists
Electronic music discographies

it:Discografia di Benny Benassi